Charles Justus Kurth (October 23, 1862 – September 28, 1896) was an American lawyer and politician.

Life 
Kurth was born on October 23, 1862 in Brooklyn, New York.

Kurth attended Public School No. 3 in Brooklyn, the Royal College at Brandenburgh, Prussia, and Columbia Law School. He was admitted to the bar in 1884 and had a law office at 375-379 Fulton Street. He also had a law office at 200 Montague Street, and by the time he died he practiced law in the Germania bank building at Fulton Street. While young, he studied law in the law firm Place, Nelson & Place. As a lawyer, he was involved in the acquittal of Annie Phillips, George L. Nicodemus, and Mary Ramsay of the charge of murder.

During the reign of John Y. McKane of Gravesend, Kurth was counsel to a number of official boards there, notably the board of health and the town board. In 1889, he was elected to the New York State Assembly as a Republican, representing the Kings County 12th District. He served in the Assembly in 1890. He was a delegate to the 1894 New York State Constitutional Convention.

Kurth was district clerk of the School District No. 6 of Gravesend, secretary of the Coney Island Fire Department and the John S. McKeon Association of Gravesend, and a member of the Order of United Friends, the Ancient Order of Foresters of America, and the American Legion of Honor. In 1887, he married Jessie Woolsey of Gravesend. They had two children.

Kurth died in Seney Hospital on September 28, 1896. His funeral was conducted at his house by Rev. Lewis Edwin Pease, pastor of the Church of Our Father, First Universalist Church. He was buried in Green-Wood Cemetery.

References

External links 

 The Political Graveyard

1862 births
1896 deaths
People from Gravesend, Brooklyn
Lawyers from Brooklyn
Politicians from Brooklyn
Columbia Law School alumni
19th-century American lawyers
19th-century American politicians
Republican Party members of the New York State Assembly
Burials at Green-Wood Cemetery